The Calgary Cardinals were a minor league baseball team located in the Canadian city of Calgary, Alberta, in 1977 and 1978.  The team was a member of the Pioneer League, playing at the Rookie League level, and affiliated with the St. Louis Cardinals of Major League Baseball (MLB). 

The Cardinals and the Medicine Hat A's were Pioneer League expansion teams in 1977.  Calgary changed affiliations to the Montreal Expos in 1979, and the team became the Calgary Expos.

Notable alumni

 Barry Cheesman (1977) 

 Jim Gott (1977)

Season records

All-stars

See also
 Calgary Cardinals players

References

External links
 Baseball Reference – Calgary teams

Defunct Pioneer League (baseball) teams
Defunct baseball teams in Canada
Baseball teams in Calgary
Baseball teams in Alberta
St. Louis Cardinals minor league affiliates
Ice hockey clubs established in 1977
Sports clubs disestablished in 1978
1977 establishments in Alberta
1978 disestablishments in Canada
Baseball teams disestablished in 1978